The TNT Boys (also known as The Big Shot Trio or Tawag ng Tanghalan Boys) are a Filipino boy band made up of three of the pre-to-early teen finalists of the 2017 television competition Tawag ng Tanghalan Kids. The members are Keifer Sanchez, Mackie Empuerto, and Francis Concepcion. In 2018, TNT Boys won as the grand winner in the second season of Your Face Sounds Familiar Kids. TNT Boys are the first Filipino act to perform in the four franchises of the talent show Little Big Shots in the Philippines, United States, United Kingdom and Australia.

History

2017: Formation from Tawag ng Tanghalan Kids 
On June 10, 2017, the Tawag ng Tanghalan Kids (TNT Kids) grand finals was held at ABS-CBN Studio 3. John Clyd Talili emerged as the grand champion, while Keifer Sanchez was on  the 2nd place, Mackie Empuerto on the 3rd place, Sheena Belarmino on the fourth spot and Francis Concepcion in fifth. Vice Ganda was instrumental in forming the trio when the boys guested on his show Gandang Gabi Vice just after the grand finals. Vice asked them to have a singing battle with Beyoncé's "Listen". The boys' performance in Gandang Gabi Vice was critically applauded and went viral on social media, with reaction videos from netizens praising their singing ability. There and then, Vice launched the kids as the TNT Boys.

2018: Talent show visits 

In April 2018, the TNT Boys appeared on the Little Big Shots US to sing Beyonce's "Listen". The episode prompted Ellen DeGeneres to tweet Beyonce: "Beyoncé, I hope you watch Sunday’s episode of #LittleBigShots." And just a day after, Little Big Shots released a clip of the performance online. Brian May, one of the members of the British rock band Queen, shared the video on his verified Facebook page, saying "Check out these lovely young lads from the Philippines. Brilliant. Great to see youngsters relating to Queen so well — and enjoying"

The group also appeared on the other franchises of Little Big Shots, including Little Big Shots UK and  Australia.

In May 2018, TNT Boys participated in the second season of Your Face Sounds Familiar Kids. During the first week of the show, the TNT Boys impersonated the Bee Gees, again receiving critical applause and attracted the attention of the group who tweeted:"Imitation truly is the sincerest from of flattery! Thank you #TNTBoys @YourFacePH for your rendition of "Too Much Heaven". #MyBeeGees,"  Other notable renditions and impersonations include songs from APO Hiking Society, Destiny's Child, Aegis, The Supremes, Mariah Carey and Boyz II Men, Spice Girls, The Three Tenors, DoReMi (Donna Cruz, Regine Velasquez, and Mikee Cojuangco), Wonder Girls, ABBA (with Sam Shoaf). After 16 weeks of performances and their grand finals impersonation of Jessie J, Ariana Grande and Nicki Minaj's "Bang Bang", they emerged as the grand winner of the second season, garnering 100% of the judges' and public votes held at UP Theater on August 19, 2018.

On October 14, 2018, the TNT Boys performed at Singaporean President Halimah Yacob's Star Charity (PSC) event in Singapore over the weekend. The three dapper young boys emerged on stage wearing matching maroon suits and treated the attendees of the charity ball to their rendition of Whitney Houston’s "The Greatest Love of All" and Beyoncé's "Listen". After their performance, President Yacob herself went backstage to personally meet and take photos with the boys.

On November 14, 2018, the boys received the Royal Cub Award at the Rawr Awards 2018 from the entertainment blog, LionhearTV. The Royal Cub Award is given to young individuals who possess incredible talent recognized globally by consistently making headlines and trending performances.  On November 18, they became a regular performer on ASAP after the show reformatted into ASAP Natin 'To. They received a Rising Pop Child Performer of the Year Award at the PPOP Awards for Young Artists 2018.

On November 30, 2018, TNT Boys broke the record as the country's youngest sold outperformers on their first major concert entitled 'Listen: The Big Shot Concert' at the Araneta Coliseum. Their guests included Jed Madela, Vice Ganda, K Brosas, Janine Berdin, Noven Belleza, John Clyde Talili, and the Your Face Sounds Familiar Kids from season 1 and 2.

2019: World tour, more talent shows, and "Starla" theme song

In the series' premiere episode on February 3, 2019, the TNT Boys appeared as contestants on the U.S. reality talent competition The World's Best. During the audition rounds, they garnered a total of 99/100 points from the American and international judges. In the battle rounds, they got a total score of 97. They lost to Naturally 7 in the championship rounds for the group variety  category.

The TNT Boys will begin their world tour featuring Angelica Hale for the North American dates in April 2019.

In October 2019, the group performed the official theme song for the fantasy drama series Starla, entitled "Ako ang Iyong Bituin".

Members
 Keifer Sanchez, born  in Davao City, Philippines
 Mackie Empuerto, born  in Manila, Philippines
 Francis Concepcion, born  in Zamboanga, Philippines

Concerts

Awards

References

External links

Filipino boy bands
Filipino child singers
Tawag ng Tanghalan contestants
Your Face Sounds Familiar winners
Musical groups established in 2017
Vocal trios
Star Music artists
2017 establishments in the Philippines